The 1942 United States Senate election in Arkansas took place on November 2, 1942. Incumbent Senator John E. Miller was appointed to a federal judgeship by Franklin Delano Roosevelt, and his appointed replacement Lloyd Spencer rejoined the Navy rather than run for re-election.

After a highly-competitive four-way primary, U.S. Representative John L. McClellan defeated Arkansas Attorney General Jack Holt in a run-off election.

Because the Republican Party (or any other party) did not field a candidate in the general election, McClellan's primary victory was tantamount to election.

Democratic primary

Candidates
Clyde T. Ellis, U.S. Representative from Bentonville
Jack Holt, Arkansas Attorney General
John L. McClellan, U.S. Representative from Camden
David D. Terry, U.S. Representative from Little Rock

Results

Runoff

General election

Results
McClellan was unopposed in the general election.

See also
1942 United States Senate elections

References 

Single-candidate elections
1942
Arkansas
United States Senate